Chikhale is a village in Panvel Taluk of Raigad district in Maharashtra state in India. It is located at a distance of 6.2 km from its Taluk headquarters Panvel and 33 km distance from Mumbai City. Chikhale has a railway station on the Panvel-Karjat route of the Mumbai Suburban Railway in Navi Mumbai, India with the same name. Panvel is the previous station and Mohape is the next station. It is followed by Chowk Railway Station and then Karjat.

Villages in Raigad district